The following is a list of mountains in the Cook Islands

Rarotonga
 Te Manga (652m)
 Te Atu Kura (638m)
 Te Kou (588m)
 Maungatea (523m)
 Maunga Roa (509m)
 Ikurangi (485m)
 Te Vaakauta (450m)
 Te Rua Manga (413m)
 Raemaru (357m)
 Toroume (329m)
 Oroenga (292m)

References

Cook Islands
Cook Islands